Kevin Nagle (born April 30, 1975) is an American football fullback/linebacker who played for the Colorado Crush in the Arena Football League. 

After the AFL suspended its 2009 season, Nagle retired and is currently an assistant coach for Pleasant Valley High School, his alma mater. Following the 2013 Pleasant Valley football season, Nagle retired from his coaching career in Pleasant Valley with an 8-3 final record, 2nd Place Division AAAA Championship.

High school years
Nagle attended Pleasant Valley High School in Brodheadsville, Pennsylvania, and was a student and a letterman in football and wrestling. As a freshman, he was quarterback and was able to beat Pleasant Valley's arch rival, Pocono Mountain.

Arena Football League
Nagle played for the Orlando Predators until he was cut in the 2007 season. He then signed with the Colorado Crush, where his jersey number was #11.

References

External links
 Colorado Crush's bio page
 AFL stats

1975 births
Living people
People from Monroe County, Pennsylvania
Sportspeople from Pennsylvania
American football fullbacks
American football linebackers
Players of American football from Pennsylvania
Nashville Kats players
Orlando Predators players
Colorado Crush players
East Stroudsburg Warriors football players